is a Japanese voice actress and singer from Aichi Prefecture who is affiliated with Stardust Promotion. She is known for her role as Haruna Mutsuishi in the multimedia project Cue!. She is also a member of the idol group Dialogue.

Biography
Uchiyama was born in Aichi Prefecture on April 28, 1998. She was greatly influenced by her older sister and they would often play together. While in elementary school she was inspired to become a voice actress after playing the video game Tales of Phantasia, a desire that grew after watching the anime series Cardfight!! Vanguard while in junior high school. To practice her skills, she would often recreate drama scenes with her older sister. As a junior high school student she was part of her school's handball team, playing as part of the starting line-up.

Uchiyama started her voice acting career in 2017 after passing an audition held by the talent agency Stardust Promotion. In 2019, she became a member of the idol group Dialogue, which became associated with the mobile game and multimedia project Cue!. She was also cast as the character Haruna Mutsuishi in Cue!, playing the role in the franchise's mobile game and its later 2022 anime adaptation. In 2021, Uchiyama became part of Seiyū e-Sports-Bu, a non-professional esports team featuring various voice actresses playing games on YouTube.

On June 25, 2022, her management announced that she will be going on hiatus due to health reasons.

Personal life
Uchiyama comes from a family of five, consisting of her parents, an older sister, herself, and a younger brother. She is an avid gamer and cites Minecraft and Fortnite as among her favorite games.

Filmography

Anime
2021
Higehiro, Girl (episode 9)

2022
Cue!, Haruna Mutsuishi

Games
2019
Cue!, Haruna Mutsuishi

2020
Onegai, Ore wo Genjitsu ni Modosanaide! Symphonia Stage, Yū Ayukawa

References

External links

1998 births
Japanese voice actresses
Living people
Stardust Promotion artists
Voice actresses from Aichi Prefecture